is a former Japanese football player.

Playing career
Ishida was born in Nara on April 17, 1983. After graduating from high school, he joined the J2 League club Yokohama FC in 2002. He played often during the first season. However he did not play at all in 2003, due to an injury and he left the club at the end of the 2003 season. In August 2004, he joined the Regional Leagues club Central Kobe (later Banditonce Kobe). He played in many matches over four seasons. In 2008, he moved to his local Nara Club in the Prefectural Leagues. The club was promoted to the Regional Leagues in 2009. He retired at the end of the 2010 season.

Club statistics

References

External links

1983 births
Living people
Association football people from Nara Prefecture
Japanese footballers
J2 League players
Yokohama FC players
Nara Club players
Association football midfielders